The last Inter-Cities Fairs Cup edition was contested in the 1970–71 season before it was abolished and replaced by the UEFA Cup, a new seasonal confederation competition. The Fairs Cup trophy had not been won by any club permanently, so it was arranged a one match play-off game between the first and last competition winners: CF Barcelona and Leeds United, respectively. The game took place on 22 September 1971 at the Camp Nou.

Match details

See also
FC Barcelona in international football competitions
Inter-Cities Fairs Cup
Leeds United F.C. in European football

References

External links
RSSSF
Fairs Cup Trophy play off - Nou Camp

2
Inter-Cities Fairs Cup
FC Barcelona matches
Leeds United F.C. matches
1971–72 in Spanish football
Inter
Football in Barcelona
September 1971 sports events in Europe
International sports competitions hosted by Catalonia
International club association football competitions hosted by Spain
Sports competitions in Barcelona
1970s in Barcelona
1971 in Catalonia

fr:Coupe des villes de foires#Finale pour l'obtention définitive du trophée